Heather Marie Diosano Cooke (born 25 December 1988) is an American-born Filipino footballer and reality television series participant. She plays as a defender and a striker and has been a member of the Philippines women's national team. She was drafted to play for Landsboro IF of the Swedish Women's Football League System. In 2011, she appeared on the MTV reality series The Real World: Las Vegas, and later appeared on The Challenge: Rivals II in 2013.

Early life
Cooke's mother, Elsie, was born in the Philippines, and emigrated to the United States at the age of 21. In 2010, she graduated from Loyola University Maryland.

Club career
In 2013 she was drafted by the Washington Spirit in the NWSL Supplemental Draft. Cooke later joined Swedish third-tier club Landsbro IF in April 2014, and captained the side to a last-place finish in the 2014 season.

International goals
Scores and results list the Philippines' goal tally first.

Reality television

References

1988 births
Living people
Citizens of the Philippines through descent
Women's association football defenders
Women's association football forwards
Filipino women's footballers
Philippines women's international footballers
Filipino expatriate footballers
Filipino expatriate sportspeople in Sweden
Expatriate women's footballers in Sweden
Filipino people of American descent
American women's soccer players
Loyola Greyhounds women's soccer players
American expatriate women's soccer players
American expatriate sportspeople in Sweden
The Real World (TV series) cast members
The Challenge (TV series) contestants
American sportspeople of Filipino descent